Deer Avenger 2: Deer in the City is a video game developed by Hypnotix and published by Simon & Schuster Interactive for Windows and Macintosh in 1999.

Development
Brian McCann, known for his frequent appearances on Late Night with Conan O'Brien, voiced the character Bambo and wrote jokes for Deer Avenger 2. According to Hypnotix founder Mike Taramykin, McCann recruited colleagues from NBC to be voice actors for the series. Tina Fey and Amy Poehler were among the actors to voice characters in Deer Avenger 2.

Reception

The game received mixed to unfavorable reviews. John Lee of NextGen said that the game was "woefully short on gameplay, no question, but at least it's good for chuckles. Unless, of course, you're a hunter or a sports writer."

References

External links
 

1999 video games
Classic Mac OS games
First-person shooters
Parody video games
Simon & Schuster Interactive games
Video games developed in the United States
Windows games